Ayun is a town located in Chitral district, Khyber Pakhtunkhwa, Pakistan, 12 km south of the town of Chitral. It is located on the Chitral River at its confluence with the Bumburet River. Mountains surround the village. The Bumburet River runs the length of the village and is harnessed to generate electricity for both Ayun and for the village of Broze. The Bumburet River also provides water for irrigation and for drinking. It is home to a large number of animist Kalash people.

References

CIADP and AVDP join hands for development of Ayun Valley, Chitral

Populated places in Chitral District